Conus spurius, common name the alphabet cone, is a species of sea snail, a marine gastropod mollusk in the family Conidae, the cone snails and their allies.

Like all species within the genus Conus, these snails are predatory and venomous. They are capable of "stinging" humans, therefore live ones should be handled carefully or not at all.

Subspecies
 Conus spurius aureofasciatus Rehder & Abbott, 1951(synonym: Lindaconus spurius aureofasciatus (Rehder & Abbott, 1951))
 Conus spurius baylei Jousseaume, 1872 (synonyms: Conus baylei Jousseaume, 1872; Lindaconus spurius baylei (Jousseaume, 1872) )
 Conus spurius lorenzianus Dillwyn, 1817 (synonyms: Conus flammeus Lamarck, 1810 (invalid: junior secondary homonym of Cucullus flammeus Röding, 1798; C. phlogopus is a replacement name); Conus lorenzianus Dillwyn, 1817; Conus phlogopus Tomlin, 1937; Conus undatus Kiener, 1847; Lindaconus spurius lorenzianus (Dillwyn, 1817))
 Conus spurius spurius Gmelin, 1791 (synonym: Lindaconus spurius spurius (Gmelin, 1791))

Distribution
This marine species occurs from East Florida to Venezuela; also off the West Indies.

Description
The maximum recorded shell length is 80 mm.
The shell is white, with revolving series of spots and irregular or cloud-like markings of orange, chestnut or chocolate, often forming interrupted bands. The base of the shell is grooved. The spire shows a single broad sulcus.

Habitat
Minimum recorded depth is 0 m. Maximum recorded depth is 64 m.

References

 Rosenberg, G.; Moretzsohn, F.; García, E. F. (2009). Gastropoda (Mollusca) of the Gulf of Mexico, Pp. 579–699 in: Felder, D.L. and D.K. Camp (eds.), Gulf of Mexico–Origins, Waters, and Biota. Texas A&M Press, College Station, Texas.
 Puillandre N., Duda T.F., Meyer C., Olivera B.M. & Bouchet P. (2015). One, four or 100 genera? A new classification of the cone snails. Journal of Molluscan Studies. 81: 1–23

External links
 The Conus Biodiversity website
 Cone Shells – Knights of the Sea
 

spurius
Gastropods described in 1791
Taxa named by Johann Friedrich Gmelin